Great Britain competed at the 2014 Summer Youth Olympics, in Nanjing, China from 16 August to 28 August 2014. On 9 July 2014, the British Olympic Association named  a team of 33 athletes to compete at the Games.

Medalists
Medals awarded to participants of mixed-NOC (Combined) teams are represented in italics. These medals are not counted towards the individual NOC medal tally.

Archery

Great Britain qualified two archers from its performance at the 2013 World Archery Youth Championships.

Individual

Team

Boxing

Great Britain qualified three boxers based on its performance at the 2014 AIBA Youth World Championships

Boys

Canoeing

Great Britain qualified two boats based on its performance at the 2013 World Junior Canoe Sprint and Slalom Championships.

Boys

Girls

Equestrian

Great Britain qualified a rider.

Golf

Great Britain qualified one team of two athletes based on the 8 June 2014 IGF Combined World Amateur Golf Rankings.

Individual

Gymnastics

Artistic Gymnastics

Great Britain qualified one athlete based on its performance at the 2014 European MAG Championships and another athlete based on its performance at the 2014 European WAG Championships.

Boys

Girls

Trampoline

Great Britain qualified one athlete based on its performance at the 2014 European Trampoline Championships.

Judo

Great Britain qualified two athletes based on its performance at the 2013 Cadet World Judo Championships.

Individual

Team

Modern Pentathlon

Great Britain qualified one athlete based on its performance at the European YOG Qualifiers and another based on the 1 June 2014 Olympic Youth A Pentathlon World Rankings.

Rowing

Great Britain qualified two boats based on its performance at the 2013 World Rowing Junior Championships.

Qualification Legend: FA=Final A (medal); FB=Final B (non-medal); FC=Final C (non-medal); FD=Final D (non-medal); SA/B=Semifinals A/B; SC/D=Semifinals C/D; R=Repechage

Sailing

Great Britain qualified one boat based on its performance at the Byte CII European Continental Qualifiers.

Swimming

Great Britain qualified eight swimmers.

Boys

Girls

Mixed

Taekwondo

Great Britain qualified two athletes based on its performance at the Taekwondo Qualification Tournament.

Boys

Girls

Triathlon

Great Britain qualified two athletes based on its performance at the 2014 European Youth Olympic Games Qualifier.

Individual

Relay

References

2014 in British sport
Nations at the 2014 Summer Youth Olympics
Great Britain at the Youth Olympics